Alberto Domingo is a Spanish engineer and Doctor of Civil Engineering at the Polytechnic University of Valencia. With his colleague Carlos Lázaro, he has designed and built a number of structures, including Valencia's Oceanographic Park.

References

External links 
Biography at CMD

Living people
Year of birth missing (living people)
Spanish civil engineers